The National Institute for Communicable Diseases (NICD) is the national public health institute of South Africa, providing reference to microbiology, virology, epidemiology, surveillance and public health research to support the government's response to communicable disease threats.

The NICD serves as a resource of knowledge and expertise of communicable diseases to the South African Government, Southern African Development Community countries and the African continent. The institution assists in the planning of policies and programmes to support and respond to communicable diseases.

The main goal of the NICD is to be the national organ for South Africa for public health surveillance of communicable disease.

References

Medical research institutes in South Africa
Public health organizations
National public health agencies
Virology institutes
Microbiology institutes
Health research
Epidemiology organizations